Petroglyphs of Sikachi-Alyan are Petroglyphs on basalt rocks located near the Sikachi-Alyan Nanai village (Khabarovski krai, Russia).

The oldest of the Sikachi-Alyan petroglyphs dated to 12000 - 9000 BC. These petroglyphs have been known to local people for many centuries; the first scientific research about these rocks was done in 1859 by Richard Maack.

Pictures of the petroglyphs (the lower group) 
Petroglyphs are located on the Amur river bank downstream from the Sikachi-Alyan village. These rocks are easily accessible for viewing.

Pictures of the petroglyphs (the upper group) 
Petroglyphs are located on the Amur river bank upstream from the Sikachi-Alyan village.

Buildings and structures in Khabarovsk Krai
Petroglyphs
Cultural heritage monuments in Khabarovsk Krai
Objects of cultural heritage of Russia of federal significance
Tourist attractions in Khabarovsk Krai